Avon Township is a township in Lake County, Illinois, USA.  As of the 2010 census, its population was 65,001.

Geography
Lakes in this township include Cranberry Lake, Druce Lake, Grays Lake, Highland Lake and Third Lake.

Demographics

Elected officials
Supervisor - Michele Bauman
Clerk - Kristal Larson
Assessor - Chris Ditton
Trustees- Jeanne Kearby, Mike Dobrow, Jeff Loffredo and Rudolph Repa

Website: www.avonil.us

Cities and towns
 Grayslake (west three-quarters)
 Hainesville
 Long Lake (east quarter)
 Round Lake (east three-quarters)
 Round Lake Beach (southeast three-quarters)
 Round Lake Heights (southeast half)
 Round Lake Park
 Third Lake

Adjacent townships
 Lake Villa Township (north)
 Warren Township (east)
 Libertyville Township (southeast)
 Fremont Township (south)
 Wauconda Township (southwest)
 Grant Township (west)

Cemeteries
The township contains six cemeteries: Avon Centre in Grayslake; Druce in Third Lake; Fort Hill (historic) in Round Lake; Grayslake in Grayslake; New Gracaniga Servian Orthodox in Third Lake; St. Joseph Catholic in Round Lake.

Major highways
 U.S. Route 45
 Illinois State Route 83
 Illinois State Route 120
 Illinois State Route 134
 Illinois State Route 137

References

 U.S. Board on Geographic Names (GNIS)
 United States Census Bureau cartographic boundary files

External links
 US Census
 Illinois State Archives
 Fort Hill Cemetery

Townships in Lake County, Illinois
Townships in Illinois